Richmond Forson (born 23 May 1980) is a former professional footballer who played as a left-back and spent his career in France. Born in Ghana, he grew up in Togo and represented the Togo national team internationally.

Club career
Forson was born in Aflao, Ghana. As a youngster who started out with Sporting Club de Lome, Forson moved to France to FC Metz. His early promise, which saw interest in him by such big clubs as Arsenal, was almost eliminated when in 2001, while only 21, he was the victim of a serious road accident in France which left him unable to play for almost a year. Forson then played as a defender for Luçon and an amateur team Vendée Poiré sur Vie.

Following the 2006 World Cup from January 2007 – August 2008, Forson played two seasons for AS Cherbourg Football in the French Championnat National. In 2008 after a falling out with the coach having lost his place in the side following a period with injury, he left Cherbourg and moved to Thouars Foot 79. On 30 January 2012, Forson signed for Championnat de France amateur side AS Yzeure along with David Pathinvo and Guinean international Aboubacar Sylla.

International career
Born in Ghana, Forson grew up in Togo and was eligible to play for the Ghana and Togo national teams. While still an amateur player, he became a member of the Togo national team. His national debut came in May 2001 in a 1–0 victory against Senegal. Forson is the second football player originally from Ghana to play for the Togo. The other one is Eric Akoto. His revelation was in a four-countries tournament in Iran (Paraguay, Macedonia, Iran and Togo).

Forson was called up to the squad to participate in the 2006 World Cup where he started in two games against Switzerland and France. Both games resulted in 2–0 losses. At the 2006 World Cup, Forson was involved in the bonus dispute where the entire Togo threatened to go on strike after the national federation failed to pay the bonus money that was owed to the players. The situation was resolved with a partial payment to the players.

References

External links
 
 
 

Living people
1980 births
Footballers from Accra
Association football fullbacks
Naturalized citizens of Togo
Togolese footballers
Ghanaian footballers
Togo international footballers
Louhans-Cuiseaux FC players
Luçon FC players
Vendée Poiré-sur-Vie Football players
AS Cherbourg Football players
Thouars Foot 79 players
Moulins Yzeure Foot players
2006 FIFA World Cup players
Togolese expatriate footballers
Togolese expatriate sportspeople in France
Expatriate footballers in France
Togolese people of Ghanaian descent
21st-century Togolese people